Steve Cheredaryk (born November 20, 1975) is a Canadian retired professional ice hockey defenceman. Cheredaryk was selected by the Winnipeg Jets in the 4th round (82nd overall) of the 1994 NHL Entry Draft.

A native of Calgary, Alberta, Cheredaryk played major junior hockey with the Medicine Hat Tigers of the Western Hockey League. Drafted by the Winnipeg Jets in 1994, he went on to play 126 games in the American Hockey League and 371 games in the ECHL before retiring from professional hockey during the 2004–05 season.

Career statistics

References

External links

Living people
1975 births
Atlantic City Boardwalk Bullies players
Baton Rouge Kingfish players
Canadian ice hockey defencemen
Charlotte Checkers (1993–2010) players
Fredericton Canadiens players
Knoxville Cherokees players
Lowell Lock Monsters players
Medicine Hat Tigers players
Mississippi Sea Wolves players
New Orleans Brass players
Saint John Flames players
Springfield Falcons players
Winnipeg Jets (1979–1996) draft picks
Ice hockey people from Calgary